Return to Sleepaway Camp is a 2008 American slasher film written and directed by Robert Hiltzik. The fourth film in the Sleepaway Camp film series and first film released direct-to-video, it is a direct sequel to the Sleepaway Camp (1983), while ignoring the events of Sleepaway Camp II: Unhappy Campers (1988) and Sleepaway Camp III: Teenage Wasteland (1989). The film features Felissa Rose reprising her role as Angela Baker from the first film, following her recasting in the previous sequels, and Isaac Hayes in a posthumous cameo role as camp chef Charlie.

Plot

In 2003, Alan is a boy who is at a summer camp at Camp Manabe. The movie shows that Alan is a socially awkward and immature teen with a slovenly appearance. He tries to act tough against small kids like Pee-Pee but does this in anger as other kids bully him. Among his abusers are his stepbrother Michael and his friends Vinny and T.C., and some of the girls at the camp, mainly a girl named Bella. Several boys are lighting farts one night. Alan tries, and after failing, he threatens the other boys, but is soon stopped by camp counselor, Randy. In the dining hall, Alan gets into a violent confrontation with Randy after he complains about the food. Ronnie, the head counselor (from the original) who is nice to everyone, allows Alan to go into the kitchen and get something else to eat, but Alan gets in trouble with the short-tempered and lazy assistant cook Mickey, who attacks Alan for taking an ice cream sandwich from the freezer. Alan throws a butcher knife at Mickey and the camp owner, Frank, yells at Alan. Alan runs away, with Michael chasing him. Soon after, in the kitchen, Mickey is killed after being held above and dumped into the deep fryer. His body is then dumped in the trash compactor.

During a social, Alan is fooled by campers Terry, nicknamed "Weed", Spaz, and Stan into smoking dried cow manure, which makes him cough and fall on Stan's crotch. Camper T.C. nicknames him "Blowjob." After the social, Weed is tied to his chair and gasoline is squirted down his throat. The killer tapes his mouth shut with a “Drugs are for dummies” sticker and pokes a hole through it with a lit cigarette, causing his insides to explode. Ronnie suspects the murders that happened twenty years ago are happening again, but Frank states the murders were accidental. A week later, Alan manages to convince two girls, Karen and Marie, to go to his "secret hideout", which is just a place in the woods where he eats junk food and enjoys watching the frogs. Michael makes Alan look like he skinned the frogs, and Karen and Marie run away. Alan catches up to Karen to try to explain what happened, but T.C. gives Alan a wedgie, and he falls in the water. Later that night Michael, T.C. and Marie force Karen to lure Alan to the back of the stage, where they take his clothes off, tie him up, blindfold him and embarrass him at the social.

Ronnie suspects that counselor Petey is the killer for always being nearby when Alan is in trouble. Petey always makes a point to stick up for Alan and angrily lashes out at Alan's tormenters.  After returning to his cabin, Frank is knocked unconscious with a hammer and wakes up with his head inserted in a birdcage. The killer opens the birdcage and places two rats inside the cage. The rats eat through his head and down into his intestines. Randy and his girlfriend Linda go to the pump house to have sex. Whilst Randy urinates, the killer ties him to a tree, then tied a line of fishing wire around his penis. Upon returning, Linda panics after hearing Randy placate the killer and drives off in the jeep, not knowing that the fishing wire tied around Randy’s penis is also tied to the Jeep. Linda gets the Jeep stuck in a pot hole a little ways down the road and tries to drive it out. Whilst this is happening, the fishing wire between the Jeep and Randy has lost its slack and starts pulling on his penis. After many close calls with Linda almost freeing the Jeep, and the fishing wire pulling harder and harder on poor Randy’s dick, Linda notices the “Four-Wheel-Drive” mode in the Jeep. Linda finally frees the Jeep from the pot hole, and the fishing wire tied around Randy’s penis finally pulls it off with a loud “RIP” sound. Linda crashes after driving through a wrapped barbed wire line, which wraps around her face.

After Spaz visits T.C., a wooden spear comes through a hole in the floor while T.C. is looking into it and gouges his eye out, whereas he forces it through his head by walking into a wall. Ronnie and another camper, Jenny, find Frank dead and begin rounding up everyone. Bella goes to her cabin, where she finds that the bunk above her has been replaced with a board with spikes. The killer jumps down from the rafters and lands on the top bunk, causing the spikes to impale and kill Bella. T.C. and Bella are found dead and Ricky Thomas, Angela's cousin, is called by Sheriff Jerry. Karen runs through the camp. She finds Randy and Linda dying before bumping into the killer and fainting.

Karen wakes up with a rope hanging from a basketball hoop tied around her neck. The killer flips a switch to raise the net, causing Karen to be lifted off the ground. Michael arrives, prompting the killer to run off, and lowers the net. After Karen tells him she thinks Alan is the killer, Michael grabs a croquet mallet and runs to Alan's secret hideout, where he finds Alan, and starts beating Alan with the mallet. However, the real killer appears behind Michael as the screen fades to black.

Ronnie, Ricky, and Jenny find a badly wounded Alan. Sheriff Jerry walks up, explaining through his mechanical voice box that the victims never learned, felt the need to be so mean all the time, thought they could do anything to their victims and get away with it, and eventually got what they deserved. The killer is revealed to be Sheriff Jerry, who in turn reveals himself to be Angela Baker, the murderer from the first movie, which causes Ronnie to say "I knew it was you!" Jenny finds something on the ground and runs away screaming. Ronnie and Ricky investigate and find Michael skinned alive on the ground. The film ends with Angela laughing maniacally before suddenly stopping and staring evilly into the camera.

In a post-credits scene, a flashback set three weeks before the film shows how Angela escaped from the psychiatric clinic. She causes a brake fluid leak in a car and flags down Sheriff Pete (Carlo Vogel), the real sheriff. She murders him by dropping the car on his head and steals his uniform and equipment to become the new sheriff.

Cast

 Vincent Pastore as Frank Kostic
 Jackie Tohn as Linda O'Casey
 Jonathan Tiersten as Richard "Ricky" Thomas
 Paul DeAngelo as Ronnie Angelo
 Isaac Hayes as Charlie the Chef
 Michael Gibney as Alan Chambers
 Felissa Rose as Angela Baker / Sheriff Jerry

 Lenny Venito as Mickey
 Erin Broderick as Karen
 Shahidah McIntosh as Bella Boyd
 Adam Wylie as Terry “Weed” Williams
 Kate Simses as Petey
 Brye Cooper as Randy Jillani
 Michael Werner as Michael Dam 
 Christopher Shand as T.C. Dimas
 Jaime Radow as Jenny
 Samantha Hahn as Marie
 Kole Evans as Dina
 Carlo Vogel as Sheriff Pete

Production
Return to Sleepaway Camp concluded filming in 2003 and was scheduled to be released theatrically between 2004 and 2006, but due to unsatisfactory CGI effects and a lack of distribution deals, it did not see release until November 2008. An executive producer of the film, Thomas E. van Dell, claimed that most of the corrected CGI had been completed by December 2006, but director, Robert Hiltzik, felt that it needed more work to meet his expectations. By 2007, compositors and CGI personnel had been hired by van Dell to correct the effects. Additionally, a small special F/X group was hired to reshoot work unapproved by Hiltzik; such included the skinned body of the character Michael, additions to the death of camper T.C., and unfinished/pick-up shots. All work was finished by 2008, and the producers secured distribution through Magnolia Pictures.

Release
The film was released direct-to-video in the United States in November 2008, and was released internationally in 2009.

Reception

Critical response
A 2/5 was bestowed by David Harley of Bloody Disgusting, who regarded Return to Sleepaway Camp as a draggy, unimaginative, and unfunny film with an ending "that manages to disappoint with its banality". Dread Central's Steve Barton gave Return to Sleepaway Camp a 1½ out 5, and summarized his review with: "Gone is the really black humor of the first film. Gone is the insane twist. Gone are the inventive kills. And gone is nearly all of the charm that has kept this franchise alive. I would have rated this even lower if not for the nostalgia factor. Man, what a letdown". In his review for DVD Verdict, Gordon Sullivan wrote that "Return to Sleepaway Camp makes Sleepaway Camp III: Teenage Wasteland look like Shakespeare. A poor script, a total lack of compelling campers, and a too-brief glimpse of Angela all spell trouble for this nostalgic trip back to camp-land. I know that diehard fans of the original film will likely get suckered into watching this, but everyone else should stay far, far away". A 1/4 was awarded by Arrow in the Head's Pat Torfe, who concluded: "A 'return' this is not. Hiltzik should've taken Sleepaway Camp IV: The Survivors demise as a warning and let this series go quietly. Return is nothing what the original trilogy was in terms of kills or fun. It limps by on sloppy editing, unlikeable characters, unsatisfying kills and hopes that people get pulled in by the return of past characters".

References

External links
Sleepaway Camp movies
 

CKY
2000s slasher films
American sequel films
American slasher films
Alternative sequel films
2008 horror films
Films set in 2003
Films about bullying
Films set in New York (state)
Films about summer camps
Films shot in New York (state)
Mass murder in fiction
Fiction about animal cruelty
American teen horror films
American independent films
Films shot in Pennsylvania
Direct-to-video horror films
Direct-to-video sequel films
Transgender-related films
LGBT-related horror films
American LGBT-related films
Sleepaway Camp (film series)
2008 LGBT-related films
2000s English-language films
2000s American films